Chan Yung-jan and Chuang Chia-jung are the defending champions but only Chuang Chia-jung participated this year.

Chuang Chia-jung partnered Akgul Amanmuradova, but they lost in semifinals to Yulia Beygelzimer and Vitalia Diatchenko.

Seeds

Draw

Draw
{{16TeamBracket-Compact-Tennis3-Byes
| RD1=First round
| RD2=Quarterfinals
| RD3=Semifinals
| RD4=Final

| RD1-seed03= 
| RD1-team03= S Hisamatsu M Tangphong
| RD1-score03-1=1
| RD1-score03-2=4
| RD1-score03-3=  
| RD1-seed04= 
| RD1-team04= R Fuda T Yonemura
| RD1-score04-1=6
| RD1-score04-2=6
| RD1-score04-3= 

| RD1-seed07=  
| RD1-team07=
| RD1-score07-1=0
| RD1-score07-2=63
| RD1-score07-3= 
| RD1-seed08= 
| RD1-team08= Y Beygelzimer V Diatchenko
| RD1-score08-1=6
| RD1-score08-2=7
| RD1-score08-3= 

| RD1-seed09= 
| RD1-team09= I Lisjak T Paszek
| RD1-score09-1=3
| RD1-score09-2=2
| RD1-score09-3= 
| RD1-seed10= 
| RD1-team10= E Bovina K Pervak
| RD1-score10-1=6
| RD1-score10-2=6
| RD1-score10-3= 

| RD1-seed13= 
| RD1-team13= A Besser M Moulton-Levy
| RD1-score13-1=4
| RD1-score13-2=0
| RD1-score13-3= 
| RD1-seed14=WC
| RD1-team14=
| RD1-score14-1=6
| RD1-score14-2=6
| RD1-score14-3= 

| RD2-seed01=1
| RD2-team01=
| RD2-score01-1=6
| RD2-score01-2=6
| RD2-score01-3= 
| RD2-seed02= 
| RD2-team02= R Fuda T Yonemura
| RD2-score02-1=1
| RD2-score02-2=3
| RD2-score02-3= 

| RD2-seed03=4
| RD2-team03= A Klepač U Radwańska
| RD2-score03-1= 
| RD2-score03-2= 
| RD2-score03-3= 
| RD2-seed04= 
| RD2-team04= Y Beygelzimer V Diatchenko
| RD2-score04-1=w/o
| RD2-score04-2= 
| RD2-score04-3= 

| RD2-seed05= 
| RD2-team05= E Bovina K Pervak 
| RD2-score05-1=4
| RD2-score05-2=3
| RD2-score05-3= 
| RD2-seed06=3
| RD2-team06= S Mirza M Santangelo
| RD2-score06-1=6
| RD2-score06-2=6
| RD2-score06-3= 

| RD2-seed07=WC
| RD2-team07= N Wannasuk V Wongteanchai
| RD2-score07-1=0
| RD2-score07-2=3
| RD2-score07-3= 
| RD2-seed08=2
| RD2-team08= Y Shvedova T Tanasugarn
| RD2-score08-1=6
| RD2-score08-2=6
| RD2-score08-3= 

| RD3-seed01=1
| RD3-team01=
| RD3-score01-1=2
| RD3-score01-2=4
| RD3-score01-3= 
| RD3-seed02= 
| RD3-team02= Y Beygelzimer V Diatchenko
| RD3-score02-1=6
| RD3-score02-2=6
| RD3-score02-3= 

| RD3-seed03=3
| RD3-team03= S Mirza M Santangelo
| RD3-score03-1=6
| RD3-score03-2=2
| RD3-score03-3=[7]
| RD3-seed04=2
| RD3-team04= Y Shvedova T Tanasugarn
| RD3-score04-1=2
| RD3-score04-2=6
| RD3-score04-3=[10]

| RD4-seed01= 
| RD4-team01=
| RD4-score01-1=3
| RD4-score01-2=2
| RD4-score01-3= 
| RD4-seed02=2
| RD4-team02=

External links
Draw

Doubles
PTT Pattaya Women's Open - Doubles
 in women's tennis